Ziaur Rahman (born 1974) is a Bangladeshi chess player who received the FIDE title of Grandmaster in 2002. He holds the highest FIDE rating ever achieved by a Bangladeshi chess player (2570 in October 2005).

Early life and career
Rahman passed his SSC from Government Laboratory High School. He later graduated from University of Dhaka. He earned the International Master (IM) title in 1993 and the GM title in 2002.

In 2021, he won the Mujib Borsho Invitational at Dhaka with a score of 7.5/9

His playing style is solid positional.

See also

References

External links
 
 
 
 

1974 births
Living people
Bangladeshi chess players
Chess grandmasters
Asian Games competitors for Bangladesh
Chess players at the 2010 Asian Games
Recipients of the Bangladesh National Sports Award